Anisopodus brevis is a species of beetle in the family Cerambycidae that was described by Gahan in 1892.

References

Anisopodus
Beetles described in 1892
Taxa named by Charles Joseph Gahan